Valerio Grazini (born 26 September 1992) is an Italian sport shooter.

He participated, from 2009 to 2019, at nine editions of the ISSF World Shooting Championships and won six medals at international senior level and five with the team.

References

External links
 

Living people
1992 births
Italian male sport shooters
Trap and double trap shooters
People from Viterbo
Universiade gold medalists for Italy
Universiade silver medalists for Italy
Universiade medalists in shooting
Shooters at the 2019 European Games
European Games medalists in shooting
European Games silver medalists for Italy
Shooters of Centro Sportivo Carabinieri
Medalists at the 2013 Summer Universiade
Medalists at the 2015 Summer Universiade
Sportspeople from the Province of Viterbo
21st-century Italian people